Těrlicko Dam is a water reservoir and dam in Těrlicko, Moravian-Silesian Region, Czech Republic. Its surface is 2.66 km², dam is built on a Stonávka River. It was constructed in 1955–1962.

Construction of the dam had major impact on the village. 141 buildings were sunk, including many community buildings and also a church. Těrlicko was eventually transformed into a village with many tourist attractions. Many recreational centres were built. The reservoir is a popular spot for water sports, and is also used to supply water for nearby coal mines and Třinec Iron and Steel Works.

References

External links 
  Entry at Odra Basin website

Dams in the Czech Republic
Karviná District
Cieszyn Silesia
Buildings and structures in the Moravian-Silesian Region
Dams completed in 1962